Shaytown may refer to:
Shaytown, Michigan
Shaytown, New Jersey